Gnaphalium imbaburense is a species of flowering plant in the family Asteraceae.
It is found only in Ecuador.  The plant's natural habitat is subtropical or tropical moist montane forests.  It is threatened by habitat loss.

References

Data deficient plants
Flora of Ecuador
imbaburense
Taxonomy articles created by Polbot